Kozlovka is a rural locality (a selo) in Volokonovsky District, Belgorod Oblast, Russia. The population was 150 as of 2010. There is 1 street.

Geography 
Kozlovka is located 11 km south of Volokonovka (the district's administrative centre) by road. Pyatnitskoye is the nearest rural locality.

References 

Rural localities in Volokonovsky District